Uinta is a monotypic moth genus of the family Pyralidae described by George Duryea Hulst in 1888. Its single species, Uinta oreadella, described in the same publication, is known from the US state of Colorado.

References

Monotypic moth genera
Phycitinae
Moths of North America